Santo António is a civil parish in the municipality of São Roque do Pico on the northern coast of the island of Pico in the Portuguese archipelago of the Azores.

History

The parish remotes to the end of the 17th century, when it was ecclesiastical parish of Santo António, in honour of Anthony of Padua. Its principal centre of worship was dedicated to the invocation of the saint, the single-belfry Church of Santo António (which was unique at the time for having only one belltower, as compared to the other churches on the island). The church was dotted with a valuable retable located in the presbytery, elaborated in thin guildwork and its stoic large images dedicated to St. Anthony and the Sacred Heart of Jesus.

In addition, the parish included several hermitages dedicated to their respective saints, including the Hermitage of São Vicente, the Hermitage of Santa Ana, the chapel of Santo António da Furna, the Church of Santo António and the Império of the Divine Holy Spirit of Santo António, which all characterize the history of their localities.

Geography
Santo António is one of the northern parishes of the municipality of São Roque do Pico; the administrative division, in the form of a trapezoid extends from the northern coast into the interior, partially dividing the mountain of Pico with its neighbours. It contains the localities Almas, Areal, Ginjal, Santana and São Vicente.

Also in the civil parish is the Vigia da Baleia (a whalewatching outpost) situated at the top of the Cabeço da Vigia in Santana, which was constructed in the 20th century. Used originally for spotting whales transiting the region's waters, the outpost was part of the signaling system for hunting whales. Today it is an important local viewpoint, providing views of the coastal landscape and horizon. A simple rectangular structure, the structure is formed from reinforced concrete and the site accessible by pedestrian trail.

The developed human spaces includes the Jardim das Furnas (Furnas Garden), that includes children's playground and campsite. In addition, the coastal geomorphology has been responsible for the formation of inlets and coves that support maritime activities, that include the Piscinas Naturais da Furna de Santo António (Natural Pools of Furna de Santo António), a swimming area hewed from the crags and volcanic rocks of the northern coast.

Architecture

Civic
 Gate on Ladeira de Santo António
 Lookout of the Chorões
 Old Roadway Santana ao Lajido
 Port of Guindaste
 Residences on Rua da Igreja
 Residences on Rua de Baixo de Santo António
 Residence on Largo da Ermida
 Residence on Rua de Santo António
 Residence in Furna 
 Residence with Tower on Rua das Almas (
 Rural Residence on Caminho de São Vicente
 Threshing Circle of Canada do Mar
 Tidal Pool of Canada do Mar
 Tidal Pool of Retiro
 Windmill of Caminho de Baixo da Eira
 Windmill of the Santana Primary School
 Whalewatching Outpost of Santana

Religious
 Church of Santo António
 Hermitage of Mãe de Deus
 Império of Santana

References

Freguesias of São Roque do Pico